

Track listing 

 "Melting the Ice Queen" – 7:46 (The Workshop Edit)
 "Fort Apache" – 4:51
 "Celebrity Art Party" – 3:18

References
 Kanine Records artist page
 Oxford Collapse official website

Oxford Collapse albums
2004 remix albums